Pascal Donnadieu (born May 29, 1964) is a French former basketball player, and professional basketball coach, for Nanterre 92.

Playing career
Donnadieu ended his basketball playing career in 1991, at age 27. He retired due to knee injuries.

Coaching career

Clubs
For years, Donnadieu's club coaching career has been strictly related to the French League club Nanterre 92, of which, he has been the long-time head coach.

French national team
Early in 2014, Donnadieu was appointed the head coach of the French Under-23 national team. In 2016, he became an assistant coach of the senior men's French national basketball team.

References

External links
EuroLeague Coach Profile at euroleague.net
French League Coach Profile at lnb.fr 

1964 births
Living people
FIBA Europe Cup-winning coaches
French basketball coaches
French men's basketball players
Nanterre 92 coaches